HiOS, is an Android-based operating system developed by Hong Kong mobile phone manufacturer Tecno Mobile, a subsidiary of Transsion Holdings, exclusively for their smartphones.

HiOS allows for a wide range of user customization without requiring rooting the mobile device. The operating system is also bundled with utility applications that allow users to free up memory, freeze applications, limit data accessibility to applications among others. HiOS comes with features like; Launcher, Private Safe, Split Screen and Lockscreen Notification.

History
In April 2016, Tecno Mobile released HiOS 1.0, based on Android 6.0 "Marshmallow", featuring a launcher and micro-intelligence. The HiOS was first launched on Tecno Boom J8.  In March 2017, HiOS 2.0 was released based on Android 7.0 "Nougat", launching on Camon CX and L9 Plus. It also came with launcher, consisting of Hi Search, Hi Theme, Hi Manager and split screen.

In October 2017, HiOS 3.0 was also released based on Android 7.0 as seen in HiOS 2.0, but with improved user interfaces, launching on Phantom 8 and Camon CM. HiOS 3.0 also came with Boomplay Music and Phoenix Browser as primary browsers, it also came with T-Point, Micro Intelligence and Eye Care.

In November 2018, HiOS 4.1 was released based on Android 8.1 "Oreo", launching on Camon 11 and Camon 11 Pro, featuring ZeroScreen, one-hand mode and dual apps. The HiOS 4.1 also came with Gesture Navigation and Face ID.

In April 2019, HiOS 5.0 was released based on Android 9.0 "Pie", launching on Spark 3 and Phantom 9, featuring Smart Panel, AI Read Mode and Intelligent Voice Broadcast. In September 2019, HiOS 5.5 was also released based on Android 9.0 "Pie", launching on Camon 12 and Spark 4, featuring AR Virtual Canvas, Closed Eye Detection, Gesture Call Picker and Fingerprint Reset Password.

In February 2020, HiOS 6.0 was released based on Android 10, launching on Camon 15. The beta version of HiOS 6.0 was released to Tecno Spark 3 Pro on 1 December 2019, featuring system-wide Dark Theme, Social Turbo and Game mode.

In September 2020, HiOS 7.0 was released based on Android 10, launching on Camon 16 series.

In May 2021, HiOS 7.6 was released based on Android 11, launching on Camon 17 series.

In August 2021, HiOS 7.6 was released as a upgrade based on Android 11, on Camon 16 series

See also 
 XOS (operating system)

References

Mobile operating systems